In epidemiology, attributable risk or excess risk is a term synonymous to risk difference, that has also been used to denote attributable fraction among the exposed and attributable fraction for the population.

See also

 Population Impact Measures

References 

Epidemiology